Penicillium kenraperi is a species of the genus of Penicillium.

References

kenraperi